Ichiyama is a Japanese surname. Notable people with the surname include:

Dennis Ichiyama, American artist
Linda Ichiyama, American politician
, Japanese long-distance runner

Japanese-language surnames